Homoranthus porteri is a plant in the myrtle family Myrtaceae, and is endemic to a small area in northern Queensland, Australia. It is an upright shrub with creamy-white to red pendulous flowers in pairs on a short stalk with red bracts and small linear leaves.

Description
The small flowers hang pendulous in pairs on a stalk from the leaf axils. Flowering occurs mostly in autumn but may flower and fruit sporadically throughout the year.

Taxonomy and naming
This species was first formally described in 1931 by C.T. White who gave it the name of Darwinia porteri and published the description in Proceedings of the Royal Society of Queensland. In 1991, Lyndley Craven and S.R.Jones changed the name to Homoranthus porteri. The specific epithet (porteri) honours Charles Porter who collected the type specimen.

Distribution and habitat
Homoranthus porteri is restricted to an area between Mareeba and Ravenshoe, Queensland. It is usually found adjacent to woodland, scree slopes or heath, growing on shallow sandstone soils and rock outcrops.

Conservation
Homoranthus porteri is listed as "vulnerable" under the Australian Government EPBC Act. This species is uncommon with a restricted distribution, ROTAP conservation code 2V, Briggs and Leigh (1996).

References

External links
 The Australasian Virtual Herbarium – Occurrence data for Homoranthus porteri

Flora of Queensland
Myrtales of Australia
porteri
Plants described in 1984